CIMB Group is a financial services provider in Malaysia.

CIMB may also refer to:

 Current Issues in Molecular Biology, an academic scientific periodical

See also 
 CIMB-FM, a radio station of Quebec, Canada
 CINB-FM, a radio station of New Brunswick, Canada
 cymb., an abbreviation for Cymbal
 SinB, a member of Korean girl group GFriend